Tengion, Inc. is an American development-stage regenerative medicine company founded in 2003 with financing from J&J Development Corporation, HealthCap and Oak Investment Partners, which is headquartered in Winston-Salem, North Carolina. Its goals are discovering, developing, manufacturing and commercializing a range of replacement organs and tissues, or neo-organs and neo-tissues, to address unmet medical needs in urologic, renal, gastrointestinal, and vascular diseases and disorders. The company creates these human neo-organs from a patient’s own cells or autologous cells, in conjunction with its Organ Regeneration Platform. The company declared Chapter 7 bankruptcy in December 2014, and it, along with its assets and tissue engineering samples, have been bought back by its creditors and former executives as of March 2015. The purchase was expedited, so that time-sensitive research can continue.

History
Founded in 2003 and formerly headquartered in East Norriton, Pennsylvania before moving to Winston-Salem, North Carolina in 2012, Tengion went public in 2010, after its stock has been approved for listing on the NASDAQ, through a $26 million IPO to help advance its research and development activities. Some of the groundbreaking regenerative medicine technologies of Dr. Anthony Atala, director of the Wake Forest Institute for Regenerative Medicine, were the core from where those research and development activities developed. On September 4, 2012, Tengion received a notice from NASDAQ stating that the company had not regained compliance with NASDAQ Listing Rule 5550(b)(1) and that its common stock would cease trading on the NASDAQ Capital Market effective on September 6, 2012, and would begin trading on the OTCQB tier of the OTC Marketplace. The company was bought by former executives and creditors after declaring bankruptcy in 2014.

Products
All current Tengion's regenerative medicine product candidates are investigational and will not be commercially available until the completion of clinical trials and the review and approval of associated marketing applications by the Food and Drug Administration.

Product candidates in clinical development
Its most advanced candidate is the Neo-Urinary Conduit. A Phase I clinical trial of the Tengion Neo-Urinary Conduit was completed in some health care institutions, in patients with bladder cancer who require a total cystectomy. The trial ended in December 2014, however information on the results has not yet been made publicly available.

The company also develops the Neo-Bladder Augment, a Phase II clinical trial product for the treatment of neurogenic bladder resulting from spina bifida in pediatric patients, as well as neurogenic bladder resulting from spinal cord injury in adult patients; the Neo-Bladder Replacement to serve as a functioning bladder, eliminating the need for an ostomy bag, for patients who have their bladders removed due to cancer; and the Neo-Kidney Augment to prevent or delay dialysis by increasing renal function in patients with advanced chronic kidney disease.

Product candidates not in active development
In addition, it is involved in developing the Neo-GI Augment, a gastrointestinal development program; and Neo-Vessel Replacement, which targets various blood vessel applications consisting of vascular access grafts, arteriovenous, and shunts for patients with ESRD (end stage renal disease) undergoing hemodialysis treatment, as well as for vessel replacement for patients undergoing coronary or peripheral artery bypass procedures.

References

Companies based in North Carolina
Biotechnology companies of the United States
Companies formerly listed on the Nasdaq
Transplantation medicine
Tissue engineering
Regenerative biomedicine
Stem cells
Companies established in 2003
Companies traded over-the-counter in the United States
Life sciences industry
Companies that have filed for Chapter 7 bankruptcy